Antonio Centa (10 August 1907 – 19 April 1979) was an Italian film actor.

Career 
Born in Maniago, Province of Pordenone, Centa was among the most active and popular actors between the mid-1930s and 1943 (when the Italian film industry almost halted because of the war). He was especially popular with the female audience, and had critically acclaimed performances, notably in Renato Castellani's films A Pistol Shot and Zazà. After the war his success declined, and he gradually started to be cast in supporting roles.

Selected filmography
 The Countess of Parma (1936)
 But It's Nothing Serious (1936)
 Bayonet (1936)
 The Two Sergeants (1936)
 Marcella (1937)
 The Three Wishes (1937)
 Princess Tarakanova (1938)
 Under the Southern Cross (1938)
 A Wife in Danger (1939)
 The Castle Ball (1939)
 Who Are You? (1939)
 The Cavalier from Kruja (1940)
 A Pistol Shot (1942)
 Headlights in the Fog (1942)
 Assunta Spina (1948) 
 The Mysterious Rider (1948) 
 Shadows on the Grand Canal (1951)
 The Rival of the Empress (1951)
 The Wages of Fear (1953)
 Mizar (Sabotaggio in mare) (1954)
 A Difficult Life (1961)
 The Black Sheep (1968)

References

External links 
 

1907 births
1979 deaths
People from the Province of Pordenone
20th-century Italian male actors
Italian male film actors